The 1930 San Francisco Gray Fog football team was an American football team that represented the University of San Francisco as an independent during the 1930 college football season. In their seventh season under head coach Jimmy Needles, the Gray Fog compiled a 6–3 record and outscored opponents by a combined total of 114 to 86.

In June 1930, the school officially announced its intention to change its name from St. Ignatius College to the University of San Francisco. The football team played under its new name, the University of San Francisco, for the first time in an October 19 game against the West Coast Army.

Schedule

References

San Francisco
San Francisco Dons football seasons
San Francisco Gray Fog football